Runcorn railway station is in the town of Runcorn in Cheshire, north-west England.

History
The station opened on 1 April 1869.

Facilities
The station has a shop and snack bar in the ticket hall. Lifts are available (integrated into the footbridge) to allow passengers to cross between the platforms. A car park (charges apply) and taxi rank are also available, and bus stops for services to other parts of Runcorn and also to Widnes.

For customers travelling with first class tickets and passes, a designated first class lounge is provided, along with standard waiting shelters.  There are customer help points, digital information screens and automated train announcements available to give train running information.

The station normally has a staffed ticket office and self-service ticket vending machines are available, allowing passengers to purchase tickets or collect pre-booked tickets (e.g. through a train operator's website or telesales centre).

Services

Avanti West Coast - (1 per hour)

There is an hourly service between Liverpool Lime Street and London Euston operated by Avanti West Coast.

West Midlands Trains - (1 per hour)

There is an hourly service between Liverpool, Crewe and Birmingham New Street operated by West Midlands Trains under the London Northwestern brand.

Transport for Wales - (1 per two hours)

Transport for Wales also runs a service every other hour between Liverpool Lime Street and Chester using the Halton Curve.

Services are less frequent in the evenings and on Sundays.

See also

 Runcorn signal box
 Runcorn East railway station

References

External links

Railway stations in the Borough of Halton
Railway stations in Great Britain opened in 1869
Former London and North Western Railway stations
Railway stations served by West Midlands Trains
Railway stations served by Avanti West Coast
Runcorn
1869 establishments in England
DfT Category C1 stations
Railway stations served by Transport for Wales Rail
Stations on the West Coast Main Line